Alexander González Peña (born November 1, 1979) is a male professional track and road racing cyclist from Colombia. He won a silver medal for his native country at the 2007 Pan American Games in Rio de Janeiro, Brazil.

Career

2003
  in Pan American Games, Track, Team Pursuit, Santo Domingo (DOM)
  in Pan American Games, Track, Madison, Santo Domingo (DOM)
1st in Aguascalientes, Team Pursuit (MEX)
alongside José Serpa, Carlos Alzate, and Juan Pablo Forero
1st in Prologue Vuelta al Valle del Cauca, Velodromo Alcides Nieto Patino (COL)
1st in  National Championship, Track, Pursuit, Duitama (COL)
2004
  in Pan American Championships, Track, Team Pursuit, San Carlos Tinaquillo
alongside José Serpa and Rafael Abreu
2005
  in Pan American Championships, Track, Team Pursuit, Mar del Plata (ARG)
  in Pan American Championships, Track, Madison, Mar del Plata (ARG)
2007
  in Pan American Games, Track, Madison, Rio de Janeiro (BRA)
2008
3rd in UCI World Cup, Track, Team Pursuit, Cali, (COL)
2009
1st in Stage 7 Vuelta a la Independencia Nacional, Bani (DOM)

References
 

1979 births
Living people
Sportspeople from Cali
Colombian male cyclists
Colombian track cyclists
Cyclists at the 2003 Pan American Games
Cyclists at the 2007 Pan American Games
Pan American Games silver medalists for Colombia
Pan American Games medalists in cycling
Central American and Caribbean Games gold medalists for Colombia
Competitors at the 2006 Central American and Caribbean Games
Central American and Caribbean Games medalists in cycling
Medalists at the 2003 Pan American Games
Medalists at the 2007 Pan American Games
21st-century Colombian people